Unicorn is the third album released by the Norwegian electronica project Ugress. It was released on Tuba Records/Port Azur in 2008.

Track listing
 "Redrum"
 "Lost In Time"
 "Evil Jeans"
 "Fail To Grow"
 "Kommisär Kontemporär"
 "The Ultimate Fix"
 "Harakiri Martini "
 "He Is My Listener"
 "Zombie Eagles"
 "Blue Magnetic Monkey"
 "Regression 22"

2008 albums
Ugress albums